The NZR H class steam locomotive was a unique class of Fell locomotive used by New Zealand Railways (NZR) on the Rimutaka Incline, the  section of 1 in 15 (6.67 %) gradient between Cross Creek and Summit, over the Rimutaka Ranges.

Introduction 
The first four H class locomotives were built for NZR by the Avonside Engine Company in 1875, and introduced on the Rimutaka Incline from its opening in 1877. They were named as Mount Cenis, Mount Cook, Mount Egmont, and Mount Tongariro.  In 1886 two additional locomotives were introduced, built by Neilson and Company. The Neilson Locomotives were known as the Dreadnoughts.

Design 

The locomotives worked on the Fell mountain railway system and had four horizontal driving wheels between the frames, gripping a centre rail and providing the extra adhesion needed for the climb. The outside engines drove the rear pair of coupled wheels of  diameter, and the inside cylinders four spring-loaded grip wheels of  diameter. On the descent, powerful hand-brakes bore against the centre rail, and brake vans with similar braking gear were interspersed at intervals in the train.

Withdrawal 
After the Second World War, the locomotives were starting to show their age, and the New Zealand government was looking for a way to cut the time between Wellington and the Wairarapa. On 7 May 1951, the contract to construct the  Rimutaka Tunnel was signed, which spelt the end of the incline, and the need for the H class.

The last revenue service for the H class was on 29 October 1955, when locomotives 199, 201, 202, 203 and 204 hauled a Carterton Show day excursion train up the incline on the return journey to Wellington. When the Rimutaka Tunnel opened five days later, two of the engines were put to work dismantling the incline that they had travelled on for 77 years.

After the closure and dismantling of the line, in February 1956 all of the H class - except H 200 which had been out of service for some time with a collapsed internal steam pipe -  were towed to Hutt Workshops. All were written off in March 1956. All except H 199 were towed to the old Silverstream rail yard in 1957 where they were scrapped. H 199 was towed to Featherston on 9 August 1958 by DE 508 (itself now preserved) and put on display in the park in Clifford Square the following month. Years later the locomotive became the centre piece in the Fell Locomotive Museum at Featherston.

Preservation 

At the opening ceremony for the Rimutaka Tunnel on 3 November 1955, the then Minister of Railways John McAlpine gifted locomotive H 199 to the town of Featherston. Following dismantling the incline, H 199 was stored at the Hutt Workshops for three years, before being moved through the Rimutaka Tunnel to Featherston. The locomotive was placed on a concrete plinth in a children's playground.

Over the years, exposure to the elements and vandalism had deteriorated the locomotive's condition. In 1980, the Friends of the Fell Society was formed with the intention of restoring H 199 for static display. Restoration began in 1981, and in 1984, the locomotive was moved into the new Fell Engine Museum adjacent to the playground. The restoration of the locomotive was completed in 1989. The society won the A & G Price Locomotive Restoration in 1990. The Rimutaka Incline Railway Heritage Trust plans to build 2 replicas of the H Class for phase 3 of their restoration plans.

References

Citations

Bibliography

External links
 New Zealand Steam Locomotives - Class H

H class
0-4-2T locomotives
Avonside locomotives
Neilson locomotives
3 ft 6 in gauge locomotives of New Zealand
Railway locomotives introduced in 1877